Jason Maguire (born 13 April 1980) is a former horse racing jockey.

Early life and career
Maguire is the nephew of another former jockey Adrian Maguire. He won the 2011 Grand National on 14/1 shot Ballabriggs. Following his Grand National win, Maguire received a five-day ban for excessive use of the whip, Ballabriggs having been driven so hard he required oxygen after the race.

Retirement
On 5 May 2016 Maguire announced his retirement. His last ride was a fall in 2015.

References

External links
 John Smiths Grand National Factfile, steeplechasing.wordpress.com; accessed 16 March 2015.

1980 births
Irish jockeys
Living people
Sportspeople from County Meath